The Game Composites GB1 GameBird is a British single-engine, two-seat, aerobatic aircraft that was designed by Philipp Steinbach and the first prototype was built by Game Composites.

Steinbach is a German aircraft designer, but not an aeronautical engineer, so he enlisted the aid of two engineers, Jing Dai and Robert Finney, to complete the design. The design work was done in the United Kingdom under Game Composites Limited of London. The aircraft is built under licence by Game Composites LLC in Bentonville, Arkansas, United States.

Design and development
The GameBird is a composite structure tandem two-seat, low-wing, cantilever monoplane powered by a  Lycoming AEIO-580-B1A piston engine. The GameBird has a fixed conventional landing gear with a steerable tailwheel.

The prototype GameBird first flew on 15 July 2015.

The GameBird was certified by European Aviation Safety Agency in the CS-23 Aerobatic category on 12 April 2017 and by the US Federal Aviation Administration under FAR 23 on 29 August 2017. Game Composites received a production certificate from the FAA in June, 2019.

As of 26 September 2021, there were 32 GB1 aircraft registered in the US.

Specifications

See also

References

External links

2010s British sport aircraft
Aerobatic aircraft
Low-wing aircraft
Aircraft first flown in 2015